This is a list of unofficial members of the Executive Council in the colonial period from 1850 to 1941. The term of the Executive Council was interrupted during the Japanese occupation of Hong Kong.

List of Unofficial Members of the Executive Council
Key:

See also
 List of Executive Council of Hong Kong unofficial members 1946–1997
 List of Legislative Council of Hong Kong members 1843–1941

References

Bibliography
Endacott, G. B. Government and people in Hong Kong, 1841–1962 : a constitutional history Hong Kong University Press. (1964) p. 250.